Tan Poi Sin is a TV drama and documentary director-producer from Malaysia. Established as a documentary director, she started out as a screenwriter, and was a producer-director in Astro. Her meritorious efforts in historical research landed her the role of Assistant Director in Astro AEC's documentary Malaysia, My Home! (2005). Her directorial work included Journey with Jason, Taste with Jason and Hai Zi. She produced, directed and wrote the script for New Village Stories (2009), which broke the rating record of locally produced Chinese content show on paid TV, and received tremendous response from the Chinese community.

Filmography

Associate Producer
Feature-length:

Petaling Street Warriors / 2011 / James Lee & Sampson Yuen (director)

References

Malaysian film directors
Malaysian women film directors
Living people
Malaysian people of Chinese descent
Year of birth missing (living people)